Mount Glowa is a prominent mountain  west of Mount Hirman in the Behrendt Mountains of Ellsworth Land, Antarctica. It was discovered and photographed from the air by the Ronne Antarctic Research Expedition (RARE) of 1947–48 under Finn Ronne. It was named by Ronne for Colonel L. William Glowa, who was an aide to General Curtis LeMay at the time RARE was organized, and who assisted in obtaining support for the expedition.

See also
 Mountains in Antarctica

References

External links

Mountains of Ellsworth Land